Erik Anders Allardt (9 August 1925 – 25 August 2020) was a Finnish sociologist.

Allardt served as professor of sociology at the University of Helsinki between 1955 and 1991, and as chancellor of Åbo Akademi University between 1992 and 1994. He is one of the most well-known and internationally distinguished Nordic social scientists. In 1995, Allardt was awarded the honorary title of akateemikko. He was born in Helsinki, and died there on 25 August, 2020. He was a fellow of the Norwegian Academy of Science and Letters from 1982. Allardt was the grandson of philologist Ivar Heikel.

References

External links

1925 births
2020 deaths
Finnish sociologists
Academic staff of the University of Helsinki
Members of the Norwegian Academy of Science and Letters